Strain may refer to:

Science and technology
 Strain (biology), variants of plants, viruses or bacteria; or an inbred animal used for experimental purposes
 Strain (chemistry), a chemical stress of a molecule
 Strain (injury), an injury to a muscle (tear in tendon) in which the muscle fibers tear as a result of over-stretching
 Strain (mechanics), a geometrical measure of deformation representing the relative displacement between particles in a material body
 Filtration, separating solids from fluids (liquids or gases) by interposing a strainer, a medium through which only the fluid can pass
 Percolation, the movement and filtering of fluids through porous materials
 Psychological stress

Other uses
 straining, in cooking, the separation of liquid from solids using a strainer or sieve.
 , the process of making a mash or purée by forcing through a sieve, rather than using a power blender. Cf. ricing (cooking)
 strain (bridge), the indication of either the trump suit or notrump in a bid made in the game of contract bridge; also called a denomination

Proper names 
 Strain (surname)

Arts and media
 Strain (manga), a 1996 manga written by Yoshiyuki Okamura, and illustrated by Ryoichi Ikegami
 Strain (music), a series of musical phrases that create a distinct melody of a piece
 Strain (album), a 2004 album by Flesh Field
 Strain: Strategic Armored Infantry, a 2006 anime
 Strain (film), a 2020 Nigerian drama

Places
 Strain, Arkansas, an unincorporated community in Richland Township of the Southern United States
 Strain, Missouri, an unincorporated community in Franklin County, Missouri, USA

See also
 Overwork
 S Train (disambiguation)
 Strain theory (disambiguation)
 Strainer, a type of sieve used to separate solids from liquids, e.g. in cooking
 The Strain (disambiguation)
 Stressor